Ibrahim Abdrabbou (born 24 January 1925) is an Egyptian retired boxer. He competed in the 1952 Summer Olympics.

References

External links

1925 births
Possibly living people
Boxers at the 1952 Summer Olympics
Egyptian male boxers
Olympic boxers of Egypt
Sportspeople from Alexandria
Bantamweight boxers